Tengenjutsu may refer to:
 Tian yuan shu, in Japanese tengenjutsu, a method of algebra in Chinese and Japanese mathematics
 Tengenjutsu (fortune telling), a Japanese fortune telling method